The 2001 Six Nations Championship was the second series of the rugby union Six Nations Championship, and the 107th international championship overall. The tournament was affected by an outbreak of the highly infectious livestock disease foot-and-mouth in Britain. As a consequence, there were restrictions on travel and Ireland's three fixtures against the home nations were postponed until September and October. 

The eventual winners were England for the second year running, although they once again missed out on the Grand Slam at the final hurdle, losing to Ireland in the final match of the tournament in October. Despite their final match defeat, England set new records for points scored (229), tries scored (29) and overall points difference (+149).

Participants

Squads

Table

Results

Round 1

Round 2

Round 3

Round 4

Round 5

Referee Tappe Henning was injured during the game and replaced by touch judge David McHugh.

Postponed matches

 
2001 rugby union tournaments for national teams
2001
2000–01 in European rugby union
2000–01 in Irish rugby union
2000–01 in English rugby union
2000–01 in Welsh rugby union
2000–01 in Scottish rugby union
2000–01 in French rugby union
2000–01 in Italian rugby union
February 2001 sports events in Europe
March 2001 sports events in Europe
April 2001 sports events in Europe
September 2001 sports events in Europe
October 2001 sports events in Europe